Gregory IV served as Greek Patriarch of Alexandria between 1398 and 1412.

References

14th-century Patriarchs of Alexandria
15th-century Patriarchs of Alexandria